Linux Fund is an organization that has been raising money and making donations to Free and Open Source Software (FOSS) projects since 1999.

IRS 501(c)(3) status was granted to Linux Fund in August 2007, allowing direct solicitations to individuals and charitable foundations.

Prior to receiving the 501(c)(3) letter, the principal funding source had been an affinity credit card program with credit cards bearing a graphic of Tux, the Linux Penguin.  Visa cards are currently offered in the US by US Bank;

Roots
Linux Fund was founded at the peak of the 1999 high-tech boom with an affinity credit card from MBNA.  They gave away their first T-shirt in the summer of 1999 at the LinuxWorld Expo.  By the summer of 2000, their Grants to Developers Program had begun.

Confusion and stagnation
A few years after surviving the dot-com bubble, the organization fell into stagnation. In June 2005, investigating reports that their website was down, NewsForge's Jay Lyman revealed that the organization was not actively distributing funds to FOSS projects.  Lyman reported that funds from the MBNA cards continued to flow and the organization had $126,155.29 (and growing) in the bank. Then-executive-director, Jerritt Collord, told Lyman that he had gotten "burned out" and that the "largely one-man organization" was sitting idle after lackluster success with his Open Oregon Technology Center.

Rebuilding
In the Fall of 2005 the founding directors met, decided to clean up the organizational backlog and start funding FOSS projects again.

In June 2005, Bank of America bought MBNA.  In April 2007, Bank of America gave Linux Fund notice that the affinity MasterCard program would be discontinued effective June 30, 2007.

On July 1, 2007 US Bank released a Linux Fund Visa card.

In August 2007 the IRS granted Linux Fund 501(c)(3) status.

In May 2009 the Open Hardware Foundation joined Linux Fund.

Current projects
Prior to cancellation by Bank of America, Linux Fund was supporting about 10 different projects including Debian, the Wikimedia Foundation, Blender (software), Free Geek, freenode, and OpenSSH. A typical grant was $500/month with renewable 6 and 12-month commitments. Linux Fund has also given lump-sum donations on the order of $1,000–$5,000.

Project funding was frozen briefly when Bank of America canceled the USA MasterCard agreement.  Funding has since resumed with the new US Bank Visa card. Current projects include a mix of open-source software and hardware projects including Gnash, Inkscape, LiVES, and the Open Graphics Project.

Funding model
In 2005 Debian Project Leader Branden Robinson thanked the Linux Fund for their continued support of the Debian Project and noted the benefit of long-term grants to FOSS projects:

This funding will ... enable us to do a bit more forward planning. Debian runs entirely on donations ... and a steady, predictable flow of revenue should help us feel comfortable with some more long-range resource planning. Linux Fund deserves not just our thanks, but credit for pioneering new funding models for the Free Software community.

Cards
 The original USA Linux Fund card was a MasterCard issued by MBNA.
 The current USA Linux Fund card is a Visa issued by US Bank.
 The current and original USA BSD Fund card is a Visa issued by US Bank.
 The Canadian Linux Fund card was a MasterCard issued by MBNA. It is no longer offered.

Board members
 Ilan Rabinovitch, Jeremy Garcia, Randal Schwartz

Current officers
 Ilan Rabinovitch, President; Jeremy Garcia, Secretary. Randal Schwartz

Former Board Members
Scott Rainey, Michael Dexter, Iris Oren, Benjamin Cox, Candace Ramcharan, Dan Carrere.

References

Sources 

 http://www.linuxfund.org/team/
 
 http://ask.slashdot.org/article.pl?sid=05/06/03/1845234
 http://www.linuxpr.com/releases/11204.html

External links
Linux Fund

Linux organizations
Philanthropic organizations based in the United States
Organizations established in 1999
1999 establishments in the United States